N. S. Boseraju is an Indian National Congress political activist and member of the Karnataka Legislative Council. He is a two-time M.L.A from Manvi assembly constituency.

Positions Held 

 2018 - Appointed as AICC Sectary in-charge of Telangana state.

See also 
 TA/DA scam

References

External links 
N.S. Bose Raju affidavit

Living people
Members of the Karnataka Legislative Council
Indian National Congress politicians from Karnataka
Year of birth missing (living people)